Arthur Frederick Duncan (20 February 1913 – 25 March 1991) was an Australian rules footballer who played for the North Melbourne Football Club in the Victorian Football League (VFL).

Duncan won the 1935 Central Gippsland Football League best and fairest award, the Elder-Berwick Medal.

Notes

External links 
		

1913 births
1991 deaths
Australian rules footballers from Melbourne
North Melbourne Football Club players
Warragul Football Club players
People from Surrey Hills, Victoria